Hypsioma gibbera is a species of beetle in the family Cerambycidae. It was described by Audinet-Serville in 1835. It is known from Argentina, Brazil and Paraguay.

References

gibbera
Beetles described in 1835